Sphenella sinensis is a species of tephritid or fruit flies in the genus Sphenella of the family Tephritidae.

Distribution
India, China & Japan to New Guinea.

References

Tephritinae
Insects described in 1868
Diptera of Asia
Diptera of Australasia